Sychyovsky District is an administrative and municipal district (raion), one of the twenty-five in Smolensk Oblast, Russia. It is located in the northeast of the oblast. Its administrative center is the town of Sychyovka. Population: 14,158 (2010 Census);  The population of Sychyovka accounts for 57.3% of the district's total population.

Geography
The western part of Sychyovsky District is a highland where sources of several rivers are located, including one of the Dnieper in the western tip of the district. Northwestern tip of the district belongs to the Western Dvina (Daugava) basin, while the rest (mostly Sychyovka lowland) drains into the Volga via the Vazuza River; some territories were flooded when a reservoir was built.

Thus, the Mediterranean–Atlantic–Caspian tripoint of the European Watershed lies there. In other words, Sychyovsky District is the eastern terminus of the Atlantic–Mediterranean watershed in Europe.

Notable people
 Nikolai Krylenko (1885–1938)
 Antonina Makarova (1920–1979)

References

Notes

Sources

Districts of Smolensk Oblast
